Neutral Bay ferry wharf is located on Neutral Bay on the northern side of Sydney Harbour serving the Sydney suburb of Neutral Bay.

On 20 February 2012, the wharf closed for a rebuild. The existing wharf was demolished, with a new one built reopening on 20 August 2012.

Wharves & services
Neutral Bay wharf is served by Sydney Ferries Neutral Bay services operated by First Fleet class ferries.

Interchanges
Keolis Downer Northern Beaches operates one route to and from Neutral Bay wharf:
225: to Cremorne Point wharf

References

External links

Neutral Bay Wharf at Transport for New South Wales (Archived 12 June 2019)
Neutral Bay Local Area Map Transport for NSW

Ferry wharves in Sydney
Neutral Bay, New South Wales